The Gitanyow First Nation are a First Nation based northeast of Terrace in northwestern British Columbia, Canada. They are part of the Gitxsan people.

Chief and Councillors

Treaty Process

They are in Stage 4 of the BC Treaty Process.

History

Demographics
The Gitanyow First Nation has 755members.

Economic Development

Social, Educational and Cultural Programs and Facilities

References

Skeena Country
Gitxsan governments